Jail Yatra may refer to:
 Jail Yatra (1981 film), an Indian Bollywood film
 Jail Yatra (1947 film), an Indian Hindi-language drama film